Arthur Edward George Rae (14 March 1860 – 25 November 1943) was a New Zealand-born Australian politician. Born in Christchurch to Charles and Ann Rae (née Beldam), he received a primary education at Blenheim before migrating to Australia in 1878, where he became a miner, shearer and journalist. He was secretary of the New South Wales Shearers' Union during the 1890 strike. He also served as Vice-President, President and Honorary-General Secretary of the Australian Workers' Union. In 1891, he was elected to the New South Wales Legislative Assembly as one of the three members for Murrumbidgee, leaving the Assembly in 1894. In 1910, Rae was elected to the Australian Senate as a Labor Senator from New South Wales. He held the seat until his defeat in 1914. He returned to the Senate, after a break of over ten years, in 1929 (elected in 1928). After the Labor split of 1931, Rae joined the Lang Labor group, but was defeated as a Lang Labor candidate in 1934.

Rae died in 1943, aged 83.

References

Australian Labor Party members of the Parliament of Australia
Lang Labor members of the Parliament of Australia
Members of the Australian Senate for New South Wales
Members of the Australian Senate
Members of the New South Wales Legislative Assembly
New Zealand emigrants to Australia
1860 births
1943 deaths
People from Christchurch
20th-century Australian politicians